Martine Brunschwig Graf (born 16 March 1950 in Fribourg) is a Swiss politician and member of the Swiss National Council for the Canton of Geneva; since 2003. Her political party is FDP.The Liberals.

Brunschwig Graf was a member of the parliament of the Canton of Geneva from 1989 to 1993; as a member of Liberal Party of Switzerland. On 14 November 1993, she was elected to the Cantonal Government and later re-elected twice in 1997 and 2001. Initially, she headed Geneva's education department: 1993–2001; and thereafter, the finance department: 2003–2005. Brunschwig Graf presided over Geneva cantonal government in 1998/1999 and 2004/2005.

References

External links
http://www.brunschwiggraf.ch

1950 births
Living people
People from Fribourg
Swiss Jews
Liberal Party of Switzerland politicians
FDP.The Liberals politicians
Women members of the National Council (Switzerland)
Members of the National Council (Switzerland)
Canton of Geneva politicians
20th-century Swiss women politicians
20th-century Swiss politicians
21st-century Swiss women politicians
21st-century Swiss politicians